The 2013 Women's National Invitation Tournament was a single-elimination tournament of 64 NCAA Division I teams that were not selected to participate in the 2013 Women's NCAA tournament. The annual tournament began on March 20 and ends on April 6. All games were played on the campus sites of participating schools. It was won by the Drexel Dragons.

Participants
The following 64 teams are the teams selected to participate in the 2013 WNIT. 31 teams have earned automatic berths into the tournament from being the highest-ranked team in their conference that failed to make the NCAA women's tournament. 33 teams earned an at-large bid into the WNIT by having a winning record but failing to make the NCAA Women's Tournament.

Automatic qualifiers

At-large bids

Final Four games 
Utah faced Kansas State in one semifinal of the WNIT played at Kansas State. Utah appeared to be in control early on, leading 21–7 with eight minutes to go in the first half, and still led by 12, 35 – 23 with just under 14 minutes left to go in the game. Utah scored the 39th point with about 7 1/2 minutes left in the game, but did not score again in regulation; Kansas State scored eight straight to tie the game at 39 points apiece. Despite scored only 13 points in the second half, Utah then scored 15 points in the five minutes of overtime to only 7 for the Wildcats to win the game 54–46 to advance to the championship game. Michelle Plouffe was the leading scorer for Utah with 24 points.

In the other semi final, the Drexel Dragons faced the Florida Gators. The Dragons were behind early but scored 11 consecutive points to take a 10 point lead halfway through the first half. Florida pulled within five points in the second half, Drexel pushed the lead back up to double digits in maintain that lead almost all the  rest of the game. Florida could lead to eight points in the final minute but Drexel hung on to win 67–57. Hollie Mershon had a double double with 28 points and 10 assists for Drexel.

In the championship game, Utah pulled out to a slim three point lead at halftime in a low-scoring game 24–21. Drexel reclaimed the lead in the second half, but Utah was up by a single point, 43–42 with less than a minute remaining in the game. Drexel Senior Holly Mershon hit a layup with 22 seconds left in the game to give the Dragons a one point lead. Utah failed to score then fouled Mershon who hit  two free throws in the final seconds to seal the win. Mershon  ended with 14 points while her teammate Taylor Wootton recorded 16 points including passing the 1000 point mark for her career. The final score was 46–43 giving the 2013 WNIT championship to the Drexel Dragons. Holly Mershon was named the tournament MVP.

Bracket

Region 1

Region 2

Region 3

Region 4

Semifinals and championship game
Played at host schools

All-tournament team
 Hollie Mershon, Drexel (MVP)
 Taylor Wootton, Drexel
 Michelle Plouffe, Utah
 Taryn Wicijowski, Utah
 Brittany Chambers, Kansas State
 Sydney Moss, Florida
Source:

See also
 2013 NCAA Division I women's basketball tournament
 2013 Women's Basketball Invitational
 2013 National Invitation Tournament
 2012 Women's National Invitation Tournament

References

Women's National Invitation Tournament
Women's National Invitation Tournament
Women's National Invitation Tournament
Women's National Invitation Tournament
Women's National Invitation Tournament